Kargili may be:
 the adjective form of the name of Kargil, a town in Ladakh, India
 Kargılı, the name of several villages in Turkey:
 Kargılı, Tarsus, in Mersin Province
 , in Tekkeköy, Samsun Province
 , in Bozova, Şanlıurfa Province

See also 
 Kargali (disambiguation)
 Kargilik (disambiguation)